Newcraighall is a South-Eastern suburb of Edinburgh, Scotland. A former mining village, its prosperity was based on the Midlothian coalfields.  The Newcraighall pit was known as 'Klondyke' and closed in the 1960s, work transferring to nearby Bilston Glen and in particular the last-to-close (1998) Monktonhall pit.  The village had a church, a Co-op and a miners' club (demolished after a fire on 15 July 2009) and bowling green. Newcraighall now plays host to an out-of-town shopping complex, Fort Kinnaird, previously known as The Fort (south of Newcraighall Road) and Kinnaird Park (north). Today, the retail park is still more commonly referred to as "The Fort" by residents.

Newcraighall railway station is on the newly reopened Borders Railway which runs from Edinburgh to Tweedbank and was formerly part of the Waverley Route to Carlisle its closure (Closed 5 January 1969) following the Beeching Report in 1963.

Newcraighall was the setting for the film My Childhood by Bill Douglas. There is a plaque to Douglas in the village. The village also contained a bridge that features in a scene from the film, however it was demolished in 2015. The village also contains a sculpture by Jake Harvey which celebrates the mining tradition of the area. On Newcraighall Road is the Craigmillar Arts Centre, with a Woman of Achievement plaque for Helen Crummy, who lived in Newcraighall for many years.

References

External links
Fort Kinnaird, Newcraighall, Edinburgh
Google map showing local paths
Local History

Areas of Edinburgh